Fogarty Creek State Recreation Area is a state park in the U.S. state of Oregon, administered by the Oregon Parks and Recreation Department.

History

The park was established in the 1950s, assembled through purchase and donation of land acquired between 1954 and 1978.  The park and the creek were named after John Fogarty, a former judge in Lincoln County.

See also
 List of Oregon state parks

References

External links
 
 

State parks of Oregon
Oregon Coast
Parks in Lincoln County, Oregon